David Douglas Mackenzie (28 December 1921 – 4 August 2005) was a Scotland international rugby union player.

Rugby union career

Mackenzie played for Edinburgh University.
He was capped by Edinburgh District to play against Glasgow District in the inter-city match of 1947, scoring a try in the match.
He represented the Scotland Probables side in 1947.

International career

He was capped six times between 1947 and 1948 on the wing.

References

External links
 player profile on scrum.com

1921 births
2005 deaths
Scottish rugby union players
Scotland international rugby union players
Rugby union players from Wallsend
Scotland Probables players
Edinburgh District (rugby union) players
Edinburgh University RFC players
Rugby union wings